The Violins of Hope collection is a collection of Holocaust related string instruments in Tel Aviv, Israel. The instruments serve to educate and memorialize the lives of prisoners in concentration camps through concerts, exhibitions and other projects. The collection is owned by father and son team Amnon and Avshalom Weinstein, who are both violin makers.

Concerts and exhibitions
In the first decade of the new millennium, Weinstein started to use the instruments of the Violins of Hope collection to initiate concerts combined with educational events teaching about the Holocaust.

References

Further reading
Dutlinger, Anne D. (2001). Art, Music and Education as Strategies for Survival: Theresienstadt 1941-1945, Herodias.
Gilbert, Shirli. Music in the Holocaust: Confronting Life in the Nazi Ghettos and Camps, Oxford University Press.
Grymes, James A. (2014). Violins of Hope - Violins of the Holocaust - Instruments of Hope and Liberation in Mankind's Darkest Hours, Harper Perennial.
Karas, Joza (1985). Music in Terezin 1941-1945, Beaufort Books.
Laks, Szyman (2000). Music of Another World (Jewish Lives), Northwestern University Press.
Newman, Richard; Kirtley, Karen (2003). Alma Rose: Vienna to Auschwitz, Amadeus Press.

See also 
 List of Holocaust memorials and museums
 List of music museums

External links 
 Violins of Hope
 Music and the Holocaust

Holocaust museums
Music museums